Konstantīns Ovčiņņikovs (born 10 November 1983 in Frunze) is a Latvian judoka.

Achievements

External links
 

1983 births
Living people
Sportspeople from Bishkek
Latvian male judoka
Judoka at the 2012 Summer Olympics
Olympic judoka of Latvia
European Games competitors for Latvia
Judoka at the 2015 European Games